Dick Twinney is an English illustrator and wildlife artist. Originally from Devon, he lives and works in Cornwall.

His work appears in the Cornish Guardian where he writes and illustrates the weekly article 'Wildlife Gallery'. He lives in St Columb Major where he has a gallery.

Books as illustrator
The Painted Seasons: Year in the Life of the Countryside 
Night Animals; by Mark Carwardine. 
The Brave Little Owl. Embossed Books

References

External links
 Home page

English illustrators
Living people
Artists from Devon
Year of birth missing (living people)